is a Japanese badminton player from the NTT East team. In 2012, he competed at the London Olympics, but did not advance to the knock-out stage after placing third in the group stage.

Achievements

BWF Grand Prix (3 titles, 1 runner-up) 
The BWF Grand Prix had two levels, the BWF Grand Prix and Grand Prix Gold. It was a series of badminton tournaments sanctioned by the Badminton World Federation (BWF) which was held from 2007 to 2017.

Men's doubles

  BWF Grand Prix Gold tournament
  BWF Grand Prix tournament

BWF International Challenge/Series (7 titles, 3 runners-up) 
Men's singles

Men's doubles

  BWF International Challenge tournament
  BWF International Series tournament

References

External links 
 

1982 births
Living people
Sportspeople from Nara Prefecture
Japanese male badminton players
Badminton players at the 2012 Summer Olympics
Olympic badminton players of Japan
21st-century Japanese people